Hiroshia nanlingana is a moth in the family Drepanidae. It is found in China (Jiangxi, Guangdong).

Etymology
The species name is derived from one of the type localities.

References

Moths described in 2014
Thyatirinae
Moths of Asia